Ameinias (sometimes spelled Amynias) is an ancient Greek name which may refer to:

 Ameinias (mythology), a companion and lover of Narcissus
 Ameinias of Athens or Ameinias of Pallene (5th century BC), a Greek trireme commander in the Battle of Salamis, and younger brother of the playwright Aeschylus
 Ameinias (philosopher) (5th century BC), a Greek philosopher, son of a Pythagorean father named Diochaites and teacher of Parmenides of Elea
 Amynias (also spelled Ameinias) (5th century BC), in 423 BC Eponymous archon in the city of Athens
 Ameinias of Iasus in Caria (4th century BC), the father of Diodorus Cronus
 Ameinias the Phocian (3rd century BC), a Greek "pirate king" and mercenary leader in the service of Antigonus II Gonatas of Macedon